Md. Kamiz Uddin Prodhan is a Jatiya Party (Ershad) politician and the former Member of Parliament of Panchagarh-2.

Career
Uddin was elected to parliament from Panchagarh-2 as a Jatiya Party candidate in 1988. He studied Law from Dhaka University. He was an Advocate at Panchagarh city. He has 2 daughters and one son. His one daughter is the citizen of The United States. His son Md. Sayem Prodhan is also a lawyer. His granddaughter is now studying at the US in Computer Science

References

Jatiya Party politicians
Living people
4th Jatiya Sangsad members
Year of birth missing (living people)